St. Mary's Church is a ruined church in Surrel, Tirana County, Albania. It is a Cultural Monument of Albania.

References

Cultural Monuments of Albania
Buildings and structures in Tirana
Church ruins in Albania